Józef Kowalczyk (born 28 August 1938) is a Polish Roman Catholic prelate, canon lawyer and diplomat who, from 1989 to 2010, served as the first apostolic nuncio to Poland since World War II. He later served as archbishop of Gniezno and primate of Poland until his retirement in 2014.

Education and early career 
Kowalczyk was born on 28 August 1938 in the village of Jadowniki Mokre near Tarnów. In 1956 he began to study at the Seminary of Olsztyn, a successor institution of the Collegium Hosianum. He was ordained priest by auxiliary bishop Józef Drzazga on 14 January 1962 and nominated vicar at the parish of the Holy Trinity in Kwidzyn shortly thereafter. In October 1963, he began his training in canon law at the Catholic University of Lublin and moved to Rome to continue his studies at the Pontifical Gregorian University in February 1965. He earned his doctorate in canon law in 1968 and a diploma of advocate of the Roman Rota in 1971. He also received a diploma of archivist of the Vatican Secret Archives.

On 19 December 1969, Kowalczyk began to work at the Congregation for Divine Worship and the Discipline of the Sacraments. In the years 1976–1978, he accompanied the nuncio for special assignments, Archbishop Luigi Poggi, on trips to the People's Republic of Poland. On 18 October 1978, two days after Cardinal Karol Wojtyła became Pope John Paul II, Kowalczyk was asked to set up a Polish section of the Vatican Secretariat of State. He went on as the head of this section until 1989. In this capacity, he often accompanied the pope in his foreign visits. Kowalczyk was additionally charged with the task of overseeing the translation and publication of works written by Wojtyła before his accession to papacy.

According to the daily Rzeczpospolita, documents held by the Institute of National Remembrance indicate that, from 1982 until 1990, Kowalczyk was registered by the Polish Communist secret police (Służba Bezpieczeństwa) as a source of information under codename "Cappino". It is uncertain whether Kowalczyk knew to have been registered or that he agreed to it.

Nuncio to Poland 
Following Solidarity's victory in the parliamentary election in June 1989, Poland resumed diplomatic relations with the Holy See on 17 July 1989. On 26 August 1989, Pope John Paul II nominated Kowalczyk as the first post-war apostolic nuncio to Poland. The pope consecrated him as titular archbishop of Heraclea in St. Peter's Basilica on 20 October 1989. Kowalczyk chose the words Fiat Voluntas Tua ("Thy will be done", quote from the Pater Noster) as his episcopal motto; his episcopal coat of arms is charged with a cross, a pastoral staff, a star symbolizing the Blessed Virgin Mary, and a plough symbolizing Kowalczyk's rural origin. The nuncio arrived in Warsaw on 23 November 1989 and presented his letter of credence to President Wojciech Jaruzelski on 6 December 1989.

As nuncio, Kowalczyk presided over the reëstablishment of the military ordinariate of Poland in 1991. Together with the Conference of Polish Bishops, he worked on a thorough reorganization of the administrative structure of the Catholic Church in Poland. This task resulted in the papal bull Totus Tuus Poloniae populus of 1992, which erected 13 new dioceses, elevated eight dioceses to archdioceses, and adjusted ecclesiastical borders to match the post-war borders of Poland.
The nuncio also negotiated with Polish authorities the text of the concordat which was signed on 28 July 1993 and ratified by Poland in 1998. The concordat, in which the Republic of Poland agreed, among other things, to recognize the legal personality of the Catholic Church and legal validity of church marriages, became a model for other concordats in Europe and for regulations on Poland's relations with other denominations. Kowalczyk was also responsible for preparing John Paul II's and Benedict XVI's papal visits to Poland in 1991, 1995, 1997, 1999, 2002, and 2006.

By tradition, Kowalczyk – in his capacity as the apostolic nuncio – acted as dean of the diplomatic corps in Poland. Although formally he was not part of the Conference of Polish Bishops, he played an important advisory role. His job was also to propose candidates for episcopal appointments to the Holy See; during his 21-year-long nunciature – the longest ever in a single country – Kowalczyk had a considerable influence on the composition of the Catholic episcopate in Poland.

Primate of Poland 

On 8 May 2010, Pope Benedict XVI accepted the resignation of retiring Archbishop Henryk Muszyński and nominated Kowalczyk as the new archbishop of Gniezno and primate of Poland.
He was ceremoniously installed at the Gniezno Cathedral on 26 June 2010.
The primatial title, which is traditionally held by the head of the oldest archbishopric in Poland, no longer carries significant power in national or church structures, but remains a prestigious honorific post.
On 17 May 2014, Kowalczyk retired as Pope Francis accepted his resignation from the archiepiscopal see of Gniezno and appointed Archbishop Wojciech Polak as his successor.

|-

References

External links 
 
 
 
 Virtual tour Gniezno Cathedral 
List of Primates of Poland 

1938 births
21st-century Roman Catholic archbishops in Poland
Pontifical Gregorian University alumni
Apostolic Nuncios to Poland
Archbishops of Gniezno
Living people
People from Tarnów County
Grand Crosses with Star and Sash of the Order of Merit of the Federal Republic of Germany